Allan Rourke (born March 6, 1980) is a Canadian former professional ice hockey player who played four seasons in the National Hockey League (NHL) for the Carolina Hurricanes, New York Islanders, and Edmonton Oilers.

Biography
Rourke was born in Mississauga, Ontario. As a youth, he played in the 1994 Quebec International Pee-Wee Hockey Tournament with the Mississauga Reps minor ice hockey team.

Rourke was selected in the 6th round of the 1998 NHL Entry Draft, 154th overall, by the Toronto Maple Leafs, after a successful junior career with the Kitchener Rangers as an offensive defenceman. He was named as a second-team all-star in the 1999–2000 OHL season.

After three seasons in the Maple Leafs organization, exclusively with the St. John's Maple Leafs of the AHL, Rourke was dealt to the Carolina Hurricanes for Harold Druken. Rourke appeared in 25 games for the Hurricanes, and spent most of two seasons with their AHL affiliate, the Lowell Lock Monsters. After signing a free agent contract with the New York Islanders, Rourke again split time between the NHL and AHL, appearing in 17 games with New York and spending the majority of his time with the Bridgeport Sound Tigers. Rourke was subsequently dealt to the Edmonton Oilers, and assigned to the Springfield Falcons after failing to make the team in training camp. On November 8, 2007, Rourke was called up in place of Bryan Young, who was assigned to Springfield.

On May 27, 2008, Rourke signed with the ERC Ingolstadt of the German League, he played with EHC Black Wings Linz, Austria last season and signed than on 4 July 2009 a contract with Krefeld Pinguine.

Career statistics

Regular season and playoffs

References

External links

1980 births
Living people
Bridgeport Sound Tigers players
Canadian expatriate ice hockey players in Germany
Canadian ice hockey defencemen
Carolina Hurricanes players
Edmonton Oilers players
EHC Black Wings Linz players
ERC Ingolstadt players
Ice hockey people from Ontario
Kitchener Rangers players
Lowell Lock Monsters players
New York Islanders players
St. John's Maple Leafs players
Sportspeople from Mississauga
Springfield Falcons players
Toronto Maple Leafs draft picks